Acrocercops tricyma is a moth of the family Gracillariidae. It is known from India (Bihar, Meghalaya) and Madagascar.

The larvae feed on Blumea species, including Blumea balsamifera and Blumea lacera. They probably mine the leaves of their host plant.

References

tricyma
Moths described in 1908
Moths of Madagascar
Moths of Asia